= Marleen Fish =

American politician (1934–2018)

Marleen M. Fish (1934–2018) was a state legislator in Colorado. A Republican, she represented Jefferson County, Colorado in the Colorado House of Representatives from 1982–1995.

She graduated from Iowa State University in 1956. She lost the 1978 Republican Primary to Hohn R. McElde.

She co-sponsored a bill establishing an off-road registration fee to fund acquisition of panda for off-road vehicle use.

Verne C. Fish was her husband.
